Rayton is a town in North-Eastern Gauteng which started out as a tin shack mining town on the farm Elandshoek. During its boom days the town served the needs of thousands of diggers and prospectors working for the Schiller, Montrose and Dunmore mining companies. A mini diamond rush sparked by Sir Thomas Cullinan's discovery of a kimberlite diamond pipe (which has since been named Cullinan Diamond Mine) nearby is what caused the town to boom.

History
The original Rayton Junction was laid out along a spur of the main NZASM railway line, which was completed in 1895 to connect the Republic of Transvaal's capital, Pretoria to the port in Delagoa Bay, Mozambique. Officials in the "Montrose Diamond Mining Company" did the town planning and named the hamlet after Lady Rachel Ray Williston, wife of the company's first manager, Colonel Balliston.

The town's first—and at the time the only—brick building was the original magistrate's office, which dates from this early time. During the Second World War Italian prisoners of war were interned at Zonderwater just north of town, and massive military logistics and supply depots were established between Cullinan and Rayton.

After the war, the Stella Diamond Mining Company bought the land around the town and declared a peri-urban municipality with relatively cheap properties. Rayton's proximity to Pretoria's expanding eastern suburbs allowed steady growth from the 1970s into the latter part of the 20th century. Today, Rayton is a thriving town that serves the need of prison wardens at the nearby Zonderwater Prison, staff at the Cullinan diamond mine as well as the surrounding farming community, with the Willem Prinsloo agricultural museum celebrating the area's rich agricultural history on the farm Kleinfontein. Many settled town residents have found employment in surrounding suburbs of Pretoria.

Demographics

Racial makeup

Notable people

Jan Ellis: Springbok loose forward who played 38 tests for South Africa until 1976.
Bennie Labuschagne: 1992 Olympian, three-time African champion, Commonwealth Games medallist and named one of South Africa's six Wrestlers of the 20th Century, now Head Coach of University of Pretoria's wrestling club.

References

External links
Rayton, SA-Venues
"The Diamond Express", Friends of the Rail

Populated places in the City of Tshwane
Mining communities in South Africa